Gawa Na ang Bala para sa Akin is a 1989 Filipino comedy film directed by Efren M. Jarlego and starring Vic Sotto, Monica Herrera, Panchito, Nova Villa, Paquito Diaz, Ruel Vernal, Larry Silva, and Rene Requiestas. It is Sotto's first solo lead role in a film, as his previous film roles were as part of the comedy trio of Tito, Vic and Joey. The film's title is in reference to the 1988 action film Gawa Na ang Bala Na Papatay sa Iyo. Produced by Regal Film, the film was released on October 25, 1989, and was a box office hit, earning ₱24 million in Metro Manila alone.

Critic Justino Dormiendo of the National Midweek gave the film a negative review, criticizing its formulaic writing, acting and disgusting humor.

Plot
Nanding and Anton are janitors at an insurance firm. When Nanding is diagnosed with cancer and acute tuberculosis from an X-ray, he plans in desperation to end his life quickly by hiring an assassin to kill him. However, Nanding realizes that his X-ray plates have apparently been mixed up, and so he now has to contend with the hitman who is out to shoot him dead.

Cast

Vic Sotto as Nanding Malusugin
Monica Herrera as Vivian
Panchito as Anton
Nova Villa as Lita
Paquito Diaz as Ramon
Ruel Vernal as syndicate member
Larry Silva as Boy Kokok
Rene Requiestas as Rene
Noel Ong as referee
Harvey Vizcarra as little brother
Ritchie Gallego as Ricky
Vangie Labalan as land lord
Ai-Ai de las Alas as Miss Sy Go Row
Beverly Salviejo as office mate
Minie Aguilar
Renato del Prado as Capt. Puten
Ernie Ortega as syndicate member
Jake (Joaquin) Fajardo as drinker
Bing Angeles as Uncle Sam
Romy Romulo as gay
Jessie Lee as Mr. Sy Go Row
Aida Pedido as mother
Dante Castro
Joe Hardy as drinker
Fred Capulong as drinker
Cris Aguilar as wrestler
Big Boy Gomez as wrestler
Danny Labra as syndicate member
Ernie David as syndicate member
Perry de Guzman as syndicate member
Bebeng Amora as syndicate member
Canton Salazar as syndicate member
Nannie Union as syndicate member
Roboto as wrestler
Pong Pong as drunk man

Release
The film was released in theaters in late October 1989.

Box office
The film was a box office success, earning ₱24 million in Metro Manila alone, and approximately tying with Starzan: Shouting Star of the Jungle as the highest-grossing comedy film in the region at the time.

Critical response
Justino Dormiendo, writing for the National Midweek, gave the film a negative review for its formulaic writing and "revolting" humor. He was highly critical of the film's low-brow approach to comedy, stating that "Twice in the film I cringed in my seat, cursing the producers and their ilk for their wanton display of vulgarity and crassness." Dormiendo also criticized the actors as "an abominable lot", but singled out actress Nova Villa for her "occasionally funny antics."

Home media
On April 8, 2020, Regal Entertainment made the film available for streaming free of charge on YouTube for a limited time before restricting access, and later made it available once again by mid-June 2021.

References

External links

1989 films
1989 comedy films
Filipino-language films
Films about assassinations
Films shot in Metro Manila
Philippine comedy films
Regal Entertainment films